The highfin carpsucker (Carpiodes velifer) is a freshwater fish found in the southeastern and midwestern United States. Its usual habitat is medium to large-size rivers where it is mostly found  beneath the surface. It reaches sexual maturity at the age of three and females lay a clutch of about two dozen eggs once a year in the spring or early summer. This fish forages on sandy or gravelly bottoms for such small invertebrates as crustaceans, protozoa and mollusks as well as filamentous algae. Young fish are preyed on by northern pike, muskellunge, walleye and largemouth bass and larger fish are caught by recreational fishermen. The highfin carpsucker competes with catfish and does not thrive in rivers with high levels of siltation.

Description
A silvery fish, it receives its specific name "velifer" from its exceptionally long dorsal fin. It can live for about twelve years.

Distribution

Highfin carpsuckers can be found throughout most of the eastern part of the United States and partially west of the Mississippi River. They have a traditional temperate-water distribution and are most commonly found between 46 and 31°N. They can inhabit waters from South Dakota to Louisiana, but are not found in the northeast portion of the United States. They can be found even more abundantly in the Mississippi River basin and the Lake Michigan drainages, as well as in adjacent rivers and drainages. The highfin carpsucker has been introduced in the Santee River and along Cape Fear in North Carolina. Highfin carpsuckers are generally found in large- to moderate-sized rivers. This species is found in medium-depth water (4 to 10 ft) usually in areas with rocky gravel substrates. They tend to stay in more shallow water than most carpsuckers and do not go in smaller streams like the quillback.

Ecology

Their diet includes an assortment of small crustaceans, protozoa, filamentous algae, and other aquatic invertebrates such as crayfish and snails. This species prefers to feed in large to moderately sized rivers, but usually stays closer to the bank than the open river channel. However, it is not common for the highfin carpsucker to be found in very shallow water. Northern pike, muskellunge, walleye, and largemouth bass have been known to prey on the highfin carpsucker. However, humans are still the most significant predator this species encounters.

The highfin carpsucker does not tolerate very much change in the water velocity and prefers to stay in moderate to swift currents. This species feeds and thrives in areas with a consistent sandy or rocky gravel substrate. Siltation can cause a variety of problems for this species, and some of the other species with which the highfin directly competes. Catfish and other carps are their toughest competitors. Some of these species possibly survive in the same areas, but the highfin carpsucker does best without much competition.  The abundance of highfin carpsuckers may have a direct impact on traditional game species, because these bottom feeders are responsible for the cleaning of their habitat. Fisheries depend on them to keep the environment in check so it can support more marketable game species.

Lifecycle

In the third year of life, this species becomes sexually mature. Highfins generally spawn from April through June, and in some states, eggs have been found until late August. They only breed once a year, not again in the fall like some species. Generally, the average clutch is around 20 to 30 young. After spawning, they live for around 12 years in the wild. However, if this species is grown in captivity, it may only live for four years.

Highfin carpsuckers migrate locally, but are not considered a migratory species.

References

Young Shawn P.; Grabowski Timothy B.; Ely Patrick C. 2010. First Record of Carpiodes velifer (Highfin Carpsucker) in the Apalachicola River, Florida. SOUTHEASTERN NATURALIST  Volume: 9   Issue: 1   Pages: 165-170 
Pam Fuller. 2011. Carpiodes velifer. USGS Nonindigenous Aquatic Species Database, Gainesville, FL. https://nas.er.usgs.gov/queries/factsheet.aspx?SpeciesID=343 RevisionDate: 3/6/2011 
Hammerson, G. 2004.Nature Serve Explorer. An online ecyclpedia of Life. Comprehensive Report Species - Carpiodes velifer
Ronald L. Woodwarda & Thomas E. Wissinga. 1976. Transactions of the American Fisheries Society. Age, Growth, and Fecundity of the Quillback (Carpiodes cyprinus) and Highfin (C. velifer) Carpsuckers in an Ohio Stream. Volume 105, Issue 3 .
Woodward RL; Wissing TE. 1976. Age, Growth, and fecundity of Quillback (Capiodes cyprinius) and Highfin (Capiodes velifer) carpsuckers in the Ohio stream. Transactions of the American Fisheris Society. Volume:105 Issue:3 Pages:411-415 
nas.er.usgs.gov/queries/factsheet.aspx?SpeciesID=343
www.dnr.state.oh.us/Default.aspx?tabid=22718
www.iowagis.org/iris/fishatlas/IA163920.html

highfin carpsucker
Freshwater fish of the United States
highfin carpsucker
highfin carpsucker